Philipp Kohlschreiber was the defending champion, but lost in the second round to Denis Istomin.

Martin Kližan won the title, defeating Istomin in the final, 6–2, 6–2. The final was the first on the ATP World Tour to be played between two qualifiers since the 2015 Apia International Sydney tournament.

Seeds
The top four seeds receive a bye into the second round.

Draw

Finals

Top half

Bottom half

Qualifying

Seeds

Qualifiers

Qualifying draw

First qualifier

Second qualifier

Third qualifier

Fourth qualifier

References

Sources
 Main draw
 Qualifying draw

2018 ATP World Tour
2018 Singles